Love+Sling (also known as Wrestler) is a 2018 South Korean comedy drama film directed by Kim Dae-woong. It stars Yoo Hae-jin, Kim Min-jae, and Lee Sung-kyung. The film was released in South Korea on May 9, 2018.

Plot
Sung-woong devotes his life to become a national-level wrestler even though wrestling doesn't interest him one bit. But his father, Gui-bo sacrifices everything for his son's “dream”. One day, Sung-woong's life is turned upside down when the girl he has a crush on confesses that she has feelings for his father instead, and thus they begin wrestling for love.

Cast
Yoo Hae-jin as Gui-bo
Kim Min-jae as Sung-woong
Lee Sung-kyung as Ga-young
Na Moon-hee as Gui-bo's mother
Sung Dong-il as Sung-soo
Jin Kyung as Mi-ra
Hwang Woo-seul-hye as Do-na
Kim Tae-hoon as Seung-hyuk
Park Gyu-young as So-young
Lee Ji-ha as Homeroom Teacher
Kim Kang-hyun as Dol-sing

Production 
Filming began on July 19, 2017 and finished October 17, 2017.

Reception 
The film opened at 897 local theaters, attracting 63,000 moviegoers on its opening day and finishing second behind Avengers: Infinity War. The film finished second during its first weekend with  gross. However, the film suffered an 80% drop on its second weekend, and a 95% drop on its third weekend. As of August 20, 2018, the film attracted 771,141 audiences with  gross.

References

External links
 
 
 Love+Sling at Naver

South Korean sports comedy-drama films
2010s sports comedy-drama films
Lotte Entertainment films
2018 films
2010s Korean-language films
2010s South Korean films